José Miguel "Txemi" Urtasun Uriz (born April 30, 1984) is a Spanish professional basketball player for Ourense of the LEB Oro. He is a 6'4" (1.93 m) tall shooting guard. His twin brother, Álex Urtasun, is also a professional basketball player.

Professional career
Urtasun began his pro career with Bilbao Basket of the Spanish 2nd Division for the 2002-03 season. He moved to UB La Palma in 2003. In 2004, he joined CAI Zaragoza. In 2005, he moved to Breogán. In 2006, he joined Bruesa GBC.

Urtasun then joined Estudiantes for the 2007-08 season, before moving to play with Baloncesto León that same season. He moved to Lucentum Alicante in 2008. In 2010, he joined Cajasol, and in 2012 he moved to Unicaja.

In December 2017, Urtasun signed with CAI Zaragoza in a one-month deal. In March 2018, after a trial period, Urtasun signed another one-month deal with Real Betis Energía Plus, this being his second stint in the Andalusian team.

On August 14, 2018, Urtasun signed with Club Melilla Baloncesto of the LEB Oro.

Spanish national team
Urtasun was a member of the junior national teams of Spain. With Spain's junior national teams, he played at the 2002 FIBA Europe Under-18 Championship and at the 2004 FIBA Europe Under-20 Championship.

Awards and accomplishments
Spanish 2nd Division Cup Champion: (2009)
Spanish 2nd Division Cup MVP: (2009)

References

External links
Twitter Account
Euroleague.net Profile
FIBA Profile
Eurobasket.com Profile
Draftexpress.com Profile
Spanish League Profile 

1984 births
Living people
Baloncesto León players
Baloncesto Málaga players
Basket Zaragoza players
Bilbao Basket players
CB Breogán players
CB Estudiantes players
CB Gran Canaria players
CB Lucentum Alicante players
Real Betis Baloncesto players
Gipuzkoa Basket players
Liga ACB players
Melilla Baloncesto players
Obradoiro CAB players
Shooting guards
Spanish men's basketball players
Sportspeople from Pamplona
UB La Palma players
Spanish twins
Twin sportspeople